Henry G. Boyle (1824–1902) was the first president of the Southern States Mission of the Church of Jesus Christ of Latter-day Saints (LDS Church).

Boyle was born in Bluestone, Tazewell County, Virginia. He converted to the Church of Jesus Christ of Latter Day Saints in 1843 after hearing of the church from Jedediah M. Grant. He then served a mission in Virginia, before moving to Nauvoo in 1845.

Boyle was then a member of the Mormon Battalion. He then reenlisted in Los Angeles and then was the head of a group that in the spring of 1848 blazed a wagon trail from Los Angeles to Salt Lake City. In 1851 he moved to San Bernardino, California. From 1853 until 1857 Boyle served as a missionary in northern California. Among those he baptized during this time was William B. Preston. He returned to Utah in 1857.

From 1867 to 1869 he served as a missionary in Virginia and North Carolina, leading a large group to Utah when returned in 1869. He was made president of the new Southern States Mission at the start of 1876 serving until 1878. He was succeeded as mission president by Union Army Civil War Veteran, John Hamilton Morgan.

Sources
Brigham Young University Mormon missionary diaries bio of Boyle
Amateur Mormon Historian article on Boyle

1824 births
1902 deaths
American leaders of the Church of Jesus Christ of Latter-day Saints
American Mormon missionaries in the United States
Converts to Mormonism
Members of the Mormon Battalion
Mission presidents (LDS Church)
Latter Day Saints from Virginia
Latter Day Saints from California
Latter Day Saints from Utah